Adapt is a 2004 studio album by Trace Bundy. This 2-disc set includes a full-length studio CD and a full-feature live DVD; recorded live at Flatirons Theater, June 30, 2004.

Track listing

References

External links
Official Trace Bundy Web site
 

Trace Bundy albums
2004 albums